Cerro La Luna is a small tepui in Bolívar state, Venezuela. It is situated off the northern flank of Auyán-tepui, just southeast of the similarly small Cerro El Sol, and forms part of the Auyán Massif. Both it and Cerro El Sol emerge near the end of a long forested ridge leading from Auyán-tepui.

See also
 Distribution of Heliamphora

References

Tepuis of Venezuela
Mountains of Venezuela
Mountains of Bolívar (state)